Bottineau is a neighborhood in the Northeast community in Minneapolis.

Location and characteristics
Bottineau's boundaries are Lowry Avenue NE to the north, University Avenue NE to the east, 16th and 17th Avenues NE to the south, and the Mississippi River to the west. The neighborhood is named for its founder, Minnesota frontiersman Pierre Bottineau, who purchased land in the area in 1845.

The neighborhood's location along the Mississippi River made it an ideal site for industry including grain mills, lumber mills and breweries. During the late 1800s and early 1900s the neighborhood became more residential (aided by an expansion of the city's streetcar system up 2nd Street NE). Bottineau suffered somewhat during the white flight of the 1950s and 1960s as many of the neighborhood's small businesses closed and single family homes were converted into multiple unit rental properties. Beginning in the 1980s, artists began to move to the neighborhood and converted formerly industrial spaces into studios. Today the neighborhood is a mixture of housing, studios/offices, and small businesses and is considered part of the Northeast Minneapolis Arts District.

Landmarks
Bottineau is home to three city parks: Bottineau Park, Edgewater Park and Gluek Park. Two charter schools are located in the neighborhood: New Visions School (K-8) and Menlo Park Academy (10-12). Many businesses are situated along University Avenue and Lowry Avenue.

The neighborhood's California Building was one of the first buildings in the area to be converted into artist spaces and remains so today.

Transportation
Bottineau is served by Metro Transit bus routes 11 (2nd Street NE) and 32 (Lowry Avenue). 22nd Avenue NE is a bicycle boulevard and a short separated bike path runs along 18th Ave NE.

References

Neighborhoods in Minneapolis
Minnesota populated places on the Mississippi River